Marcel Herzog (born 28 June 1980) is a retired footballer from Switzerland who played as goalkeeper.

After spending four years as reserve goalkeeper with MSV Duisburg, Herzog returned to his local club FC Basel as third keeper. He played his first game in the Swiss Super League on 12 May 2012 in the 6–3 home win against Grasshopper Club Zürich. At the end of the 2011–12 season he won the Double, the League Championship title and the Swiss Cup, with Basel.

Honours 
FC Basel
 Swiss Super League Champion: 2011–12
 Swiss Cup: 2011–12
 Uhrencup Winner: 2011

References

External links
 

Living people
1980 births
Swiss men's footballers
Swiss expatriate footballers
MSV Duisburg players
FC Basel players
FC Concordia Basel players
FC Schaffhausen players
FC St. Gallen players
Swiss Super League players
2. Bundesliga players
Expatriate footballers in Germany
Association football goalkeepers
People from Winterthur
Sportspeople from the canton of Zürich